The Tower of Bank Markazi is a high-rise building located in Davoodiyeh neighborhood of Tehran, between Shahid Haghani Expressway and Mirdamad Boulevard. Its facade is made of dark blue reflective glass, acting as sun protection and preventing free sight into the building. The building belongs to the Central Bank of Iran.

See also
List of tallest buildings in Tehran

References

Skyscraper office buildings in Iran
Towers in Iran
Buildings and structures in Tehran
Architecture in Iran
Government buildings completed in 1999
Office buildings completed in 1999
Postmodern architecture
Glass buildings
1999 establishments in Iran